"Doing OK" is a song by British rapper Wretch 32, featuring vocals from British singer Jacob Banks. It was released on 25 August 2013. The song was produced by Knox Brown. It peaked at number 60 on the UK Singles Chart, despite managing to reach number 8 in the UK Indie Chart. Speaking in 2015 about the song's chart performance, Wretch said "this one didn't do OK, ironically."

Music video
A music video to accompany the release of "Doing OK" was first released onto YouTube on 29 July 2013 at a total length of three minutes and twenty-four seconds.

Track listing

Personnel
 Vocals - Wretch 32, Jacob Banks
 Songwriting - Jermaine Scott, Jacob Banks, Knox Brown
 Production - Knox Brown

Charts

Release history

References

2013 songs
2013 singles
Wretch 32 songs
Ministry of Sound singles
Songs written by Wretch 32
Songs written by Jacob Banks